Annette M. Quijano (born July 4, 1962) is an American Democratic Party politician, who was selected by Union County Democrats to fill a vacancy to represent the 20th Legislative District in the New Jersey General Assembly and has since been re-elected three times to her Assembly seat. Quijano succeeded Neil M. Cohen, who resigned on July 28, 2008 amid allegations of child pornography on an official computer.

Early life 
Quijano is a native of New Jersey, the daughter of Puerto Rican parents. She is a resident of Elizabeth.

Quijano graduated from Rutgers University with a B.S. in Management and earned her Juris Doctor from Rutgers School of Law–Newark in 1991. She served clerkships at New Jersey Superior Court in Newark, and in Trenton at both the Office of the Governor's Counsel and the New Jersey Department of the Public Advocate in Trenton. She has bar admissions in both New Jersey and Pennsylvania. She is currently a municipal prosecutor for the City of Elizabeth. She has worked as a Compliance Manager for Prudential/ Aetna U.S. Healthcare and as an attorney in civil practice. She served as Chief of Staff to State Senator Raymond Lesniak from 1992–1994, Assistant Counsel to Union County, Clerk to the Union County Board of Chosen Freeholders and as the Assistant Counsel to Governors Jim McGreevey, Richard Codey and Jon Corzine. Quijano has served on the United Way Hispanic Advisory Council of Union County, the Governor's Working Group for Hispanic Affairs, a Legal Services committee in Elizabeth, and as a Commissioner for New Jersey's Congressional Redistricting efforts. She is the recipient of the Excellence in State Government Leadership and the Women of Excellence in Government awards and mentors young adults to consider law and graduate school in her free time.

New Jersey Assembly 
Quijano is the first woman and first minority to represent the 20th District. Quijano was selected by a convention of Union County Democrats over Patricia Perkins-Auguste by a vote of 87-82 to replace the vacant seat of Neil Cohen who resigned. Cohen resigned after staffers for then Assemblyman Joseph Cryan and then Senator Raymond Lesniak found child pornography on Cohen's computer. She was sworn in on September 25, 2008. She has been serving as General Assembly Deputy Majority Leader and Chairwoman of the Assembly Homeland Security and State Preparedness Committee. This is in addition to serving as a member of the Labor Committee. In June 2017, Quijano introduced a bill to designate Streptomyces griseus as New Jersey's State Microbe, to be added to the state's other state symbols. S. griseus was chosen for this honor because it is a New Jersey native that made unique contributions to healthcare and scientific research worldwide. A strain of S. griseus that produced the antibiotic streptomycin was discovered in New Jersey in 1916 and developed into an antibiotic by a Rutgers University team by Albert Schatz and Selman Waksman in 1943. A companion bill was introduced in the Senate in May 2017 by Samuel D. Thompson.

Committees 
Judiciary
Financial Institutions and Insurance
Oversight, Reform and Federal Relations

District 20
Each of the 40 districts in the New Jersey Legislature has one representative in the New Jersey Senate and two members in the New Jersey General Assembly. The other representatives from the 20th District for the 2022—23 Legislative Session are:
Senator Joseph P. Cryan (D)
Assemblyman Reginald Atkins (D)

Electoral history

New Jersey Assembly

References

External links
Assemblywoman Quijano's legislative web page, New Jersey Legislature
New Jersey Legislature financial disclosure forms - 2016  2015  2014  2013  2012  2011 2010 2009 2008

1962 births
Living people
American women lawyers
American politicians of Puerto Rican descent
Puerto Rican people in New Jersey politics
Hispanic and Latino American women in politics
Democratic Party members of the New Jersey General Assembly
New Jersey lawyers
Politicians from Elizabeth, New Jersey
Rutgers School of Law–Newark alumni
Women state legislators in New Jersey
21st-century American politicians
21st-century American women politicians
Hispanic and Latino American state legislators in New Jersey